Frederick Richards (January 20, 1903 – February 17, 1949) was an American film editor who worked for Warner Bros. for 17 years. Richards worked on films including The Unsuspected (1947), The Two Mrs. Carrolls (1947) and The Mask of Dimitrios (1944).

Selected filmography
Land Beyond the Law (1937)
Blazing Sixes (1937)
Little Pioneer (1937)
Missing Witnesses (1937)
The Beloved Brat (1938)
Out Where the Stars Begin (1938)
Girls on Probation (1938)
Torchy Blane in Chinatown (1939)
Code of the Secret Service (1939)
Kid Nightingale (1939)
Gambling on the High Seas (1940)
Service with the Colors (1940)
Passage from Hong Kong (1941)
Law of the Tropics (1941)
The Body Disappears (1941)
The Pacific Frontier (1942)
Over the Wall (1943)
The Mask of Dimitrios (1944)
Hotel Berlin (1945)
The Corn Is Green (1945)
Let's Go Swimming (1947)
The Two Mrs. Carrolls (1947)
The Unsuspected (1947)
The Decision of Christopher Blake (1948)
The Younger Brothers (1949)
One Last Fling (1949)
Montana (1950)

External links 

 

1903 births
1949 deaths
American film editors